The Scottish Militia Bill 1708 (known formerly as the Scotch Militia Bill) was a bill that was passed by the House of Commons and House of Lords of the Parliament of  Great Britain in early 1708. However, on 11 March 1708, Queen Anne withheld royal assent on the advice of her ministers for fear that the proposed militia would be disloyal. This was due to the sudden appearance of a Franco-Jacobite invasion fleet en route to Scotland which gave ministers second thoughts, at the last minute, about allowing it to reach the statute books. , it is the last occasion on which the royal veto has been used in Great Britain or the United Kingdom.

Content
The bill's long title was "An Act for settling the Militia of that Part of Great Britain called Scotland". Its object was to arm the Scottish militia, which had not been recreated at the Restoration. This happened as the unification between Scotland and England under the Acts of Union 1707 had been passed.

On the day the bill was meant to be signed, news came that the French were sailing toward Scotland for the planned invasion of 1708 and there was suspicion that the Scots might be disloyal. Therefore, support for a veto was strong and the Queen refused her royal assent to the bill.

Significance
The Scottish Militia Bill 1708 is the last bill to have been refused royal assent. Before this, King William III had vetoed bills passed by Parliament six times. Royal assent to bills generally came to be viewed as a mere formality once both Houses of Parliament had successfully read a bill three times, or a general election had taken place.

In the British colonies, the denial of royal assent (exercised on the advice of ministers) had continued past 1708, and was one of the primary complaints of the United States Declaration of Independence in 1776: that the King "has refused his Assent to Laws, most wholesome and necessary for the public Good" and "He has forbidden his Governors to pass Laws of immediate and pressing Importance".

References

1707 in British law
1707 in Great Britain
Military of Scotland
Veto
1707 in Scotland
Proposed laws of the United Kingdom
Political history of Scotland
Proposed laws of Scotland
Anne, Queen of Great Britain
Royal prerogative